Angir is a rural locality (a selo) in Pribaykalsky District, Republic of Buryatia, Russia. The population was 229 as of 2010. There is 1 street.

References 

Rural localities in Okinsky District